Narelle Autio (born 1969) is an Australian photographer. Autio is a member of the In-Public street photography collective and is a founding member of the Oculi photographic agency. She is married to the photographer Trent Parke, with whom she often collaborates.

Autio began exhibiting in 2000, collaborating with her husband Parke on The Seventh Wave. This was followed in 2002 by the series Not of this Earth. Her solo show in 2004, Watercolours, continued her exploration of Australians at leisure. She followed this in 2010 with the show The Summer of Us, a document of what is left behind on the beach, naturally and by humankind.

She has won two Walkley Awards for journalism, and two first prize World Press Photo awards and the Oskar Barnack Award for photography.

Career
Autio was born and raised in Adelaide, completing her Visual Arts degree at the University of South Australia. She began her career as a photojournalist at the Adelaide Advertiser before leaving Australia in 1994. She travelled extensively throughout the USA and Europe. In England she worked for numerous UK national newspapers as well as Australia's News Limited London bureau. Returning home in 1998 she worked as a staff photographer at the Sydney Morning Herald until 2003.

In 2001 and 2006, Autio was selected in the Australian Art Collector magazine's "Australia's 50 Most Collectable Artists".

Autio joined the In-Public street photography collective in 2001. She is a founding member of Oculi, an independent, collective photographic agency. Her work is distributed by Agence Vu. She is based in Adelaide, South Australia.

Publications

Books of work by Autio
Place in Between. London: Stanley/Barker, 2020. .

Publications with contributions by Autio
 10 – 10 Years of In-Public. London: Nick Turpin, 2010. .
The Street Photographer's Manual. London: Thames & Hudson, 2014. . By David Gibson. Includes a chapter on Autio.

Films
The Summation of Force – eight channel film directed by Autio, Parke and Matthew Bate

Awards
2000: Walkley Awards, Australia 
2001: First prize, Nature stories category, World Press Photo Award 2000, with Trent Parke (for "Australian Roadkill" series)
2002: Walkley Awards, daily life category for "School of Dance", Australia
2002: First prize, Arts and Entertainment category, World Press Photo Award 2001
2002: Oskar Barnack Award for her series Coastal Dwellers

Exhibitions 
 2000: The Seventh Wave (with Trent Parke), Stills Gallery, Sydney.
 2002: Not of this Earth, Stills Gallery, Sydney.
 2002: Dva Pivo Prosim (Two Beers Please) (with Trent Parke). Stills Gallery, Sydney.
 2002–2004: Dream/Life and The Seventh Wave (with Trent Parke). Canvas International Art Gallery, Amsterdam, 2002; FotoFreo Photographic Festival, Western Australian Maritime Museum, Fremantle, 2004; Ariel Meyerowitz Gallery, New York, 2004.
 2010: The Summer of Us. Hugo Michell Gallery, Adelaide.
 2012: Water Hole. Hugo Michell Gallery, Adelaide.
 2013: To the Sea (with Trent Parke), Hugo Michell Gallery, Adelaide.

References 

Australian photographers
Living people
Australian photojournalists
1969 births
University of South Australia alumni
Photographers from Adelaide
Walkley Award winners
Australian women photographers
Women photojournalists